FC Sliven (ФК Сливен) is a Bulgarian football club from the city of Sliven, currently playing in the Third League, the third level of Bulgarian football. The club's home ground is the Hadzhi Dimitar Stadium, with a capacity of 15,000. Club colors are orange and blue. 

FC Sliven was founded in 1914. The team made several appearances in the Bulgarian top tier, starting from 1963, establishing itself as one of the strongest teams from Southeast Bulgaria. Sliven reached its peak in 1990, when the team managed to win the 1989–90 Bulgarian Cup, its only major trophy to date. This achievement qualified the team for the UEFA Cup Winners' Cup for that season, where Sliven faced Italian team Juventus.

Financial problems started in the 1990s, which resulted in the team dropping down to the amateur leagues. The club was reformed in 2000 and managed to return to the A Group in 2008, before suffering relegation in 2011. Serious financial problems followed once more, which led to a new restructuring in 2021.

Honours
Bulgarian A Group: 
 6th place: 1983, 1986, 1992

Bulgarian Cup: 
 Winners (1): 1989–90

History

The Beginnings
OFC Sliven 2000 was founded on February 29, 2000, after the bankruptcy of FC Sliven, but as it is the real representative club of the same-name town, it keeps the tradition started back in 1914 with the first local football club Sportist. Through the years the leading club in Sliven had different names - Asenovetz, DNA, General Zaimov, Mlada Gvardia etc.

First Promotions and A Group Period
After World War II, Sliven took part in B PFG for ten years before seeing its first promotion to A PFG in season 1963-1964. Up to 2008-09, the club has played 22 seasons at the highest level of Bulgarian football (including continuously from 1974–1993).
In 1983-84 FC Sliven finished on 7th place in A PFG and qualified for the UEFA Cup for 1984-85 because of reaching the semi-finals in the Soviet Army Cup; the Cup winners Levski Sofia qualified for European Cup; the finalist was not allowed to play in European competitions; where they faced FK Željezničar Sarajevo, winning the first leg 1-0 at home, but suffering a 1-5 defeat in the second leg.

First Major Trophy and Europe
FC Sliven had its biggest success in 1990, winning the Bulgarian Cup against CSKA Sofia (2-0). The goals were scored by Valeri Valkov and Yordan Letchkov. In the 1990-91 Cup Winners Cup Sliven were drawn against Juventus, losing both matches by scores of 0-2 and 1-6.

Bankruptcy and Rebirth
Over the next few years, the club went into a deep crisis, and was relegated to the regional football groups and bankrupted. Sliven was reborn in 2000 by establishing the Municipal Football Club (OFC) Sliven 2000, led by Yordan Lechkov. In 2005 the club finally earned promotion back to the second level of Bulgarian football.

Back Among the Elite and Sudden Downfall
In May 2008, Sliven were promoted to the top flight by winning the Eastern group of Bulgaria's second division. In their first year after returning to the elite, season 2008-09, OFC Sliven managed to finish in 12th place, thus avoiding relegation. The team managed to win eight games as well as drawing eight games, earning them 32 points. These results put them six points above Vihren Sandanski, who were relegated. From the eight wins that Sliven achieved, five were from home games, as well six of the draws, while at away games, Sliven managed to win three games and draw twice. Among these wins, Sliven managed to beat Bulgarian powerhouse CSKA Sofia 3-1 at home, as well as winning 3-1 against Botev Plovdiv, a traditionally strong side in Bulgarian football. This first season in the elite was under the management of Georgi Dermendzhiev, who would later successfully coach Ludogorets Razgrad and qualify the team two times for the UEFA Champions League group stage.

Sliven's second season in the Bulgarian elite was under Serbian coach Dragoljub Simonovic, who replaced Dermendzhiev. Sliven again displayed some strong results, winning nine games in total, as well as drawing five games, for a total of 32 points. They finished five points above FC Lokomotiv Mezdra, who were relegated. Sliven managed to win against Levski Sofia at home, one of Bulgaria's best teams. At home, Sliven won six games and drew three games, while away results included three wins and two draws. 

Sliven's third consecutive season in the top flight was less successful, however. Dimcho Nenov was appointed as coach for the 2010-11 season. The team finished in last place, with only 4 wins, 7 draws, and 19 losses. This only earned the team 19 points, 6 points behind the 14th place, which would have at least qualified them for the relegation playoffs. Sliven managed three home wins, and only one away win, against fellow relegated Akademik Sofia. This relegation ended their three year stay in the A PFG. 

After their relegation from the elite, Sliven were allocated to the East 2011–12 B Group. The team largely struggled with their performance, mainly due to the fact that many top players left the club after they were relegated. Sliven finished sixth out of 10 teams, a mediocre performance. Things went from bad to worse for Sliven, however. The team began experiencing serious financial problems, which affected their results, but more importantly, their ability to play professional football. On February 26, 2013, the Bulgarian Football Union suspended Sliven's participation in the B Group, as the team could field at most seven senior players. This automatically relegated the team to the V AFG, the third tier of Bulgarian football. 

Sliven played in the third tier for three years, before being relegated to the Regional Amateur Leagues, the fourth tier of football.

Second reforming and new beginning

In 2021, the traditional team from the city was restored, called FC Sliven, and began competing in the fourth tier of Bulgarian football, the A RFG of Sliven province, for the 2020-21 season. The club is not considered a direct descendant of OFC Sliven 2000. Before the 2021-22 season, FC Sliven absorbed OFC Sliven, with the latter becoming the youth academy of the former. 

At the end of the 2021-22 season, FC Sliven won promotion to the Third League, after just one season since reforming. It was revealed that club legend Yordan Letchkov was the key man behind the success of the team once more, similarly with how he helped finance OFC Sliven 2000.

Recent Seasons
{|class="wikitable"
|-bgcolor="#efefef"
! Season
!
! Pos.
! Pl.
! W
! D
! L
! GS
! GA
! P
! Cup
! Notes
|-
|2005-06
|B PFG
|align=right |12
|align=right|26||align=right|9||align=right|4||align=right|13
|align=right|22||align=right|30||align=right|31
||1/16
|
|-
|2006-07
|B PFG
|align=right |12
|align=right|26||align=right|4||align=right|11||align=right|11
|align=right|32||align=right|52||align=right|23
||1/8
|
|-
|2007-08
|B PFG
|align=right bgcolor=lime|1
|align=right|26||align=right|19||align=right|3||align=right|4
|align=right|63||align=right|23||align=right|60
||1/8
|Promoted
|-
|2008-09
|A PFG
|align=right |12
|align=right|30||align=right|8||align=right|8||align=right|14
|align=right|32||align=right|40||align=right|32
||1/8
|
|-
|2009-10
|A PFG
|align=right |13
|align=right|30||align=right|9||align=right|5||align=right|16
|align=right|29||align=right|40||align=right|32
||1/8
|
|-
|2010-11
|A PFG
|align=right bgcolor=red|16
|align=right|30||align=right|4||align=right|7||align=right|19
|align=right|22||align=right|52||align=right|19
||1/16
|Relegated
|-
|2011-12
|B PFG
|align=right |6
|align=right|27||align=right|10||align=right|6||align=right|11
|align=right|29||align=right|23||align=right|36
||1/32
|
|-
|2012-13
|B PFG
|align=right bgcolor=red|14
|align=right|26||align=right|0||align=right|1||align=right|25
|align=right|4||align=right|75||align=right|-2
||1/22
|Relegated
|-
|2013-14
|V AFG
|align=right |16
|align=right|32||align=right|4||align=right|0||align=right|28
|align=right|33||align=right|165||align=right|12
||
|
|}

European cup history

Colours and nicknames

For the majority of their history FC Sliven have worn red and white colours. When the club was first founded in 1918, red was chosen to represent the blood of Bulgarian Voivodes  and white was chosen to represent the freedom. After the bankruptcy of FC Sliven in 2000 the club changed its name to OFC Sliven 2000, its badge, and its colours to orange shirts with blue shorts. One of the nicknames of OFC Sliven 2000 is Voivodite which means "Slavic title that originally denoted the principal commander of a military force". It was chosen because the town Sliven is famous for its Bulgarian Haiduts who fought against the Ottoman Turks in the 19th century and is known as the "City of the 100 Voivodes", a Voivode being a leader of Haiduts.

|
|
|
|
|

Current squad

Famous players

The following players included were either playing for their respective national teams or left good impression among the fans.

 Yordan Letchkov
 Nikolay Arabov
 Valeri Valkov
 Velian Parushev
 Vasil Tinchev
 Kosta Yanev
  Christian Bosch
 Zhivko Kelepov
 Ivan Valchev
 Vasil Santurov
 Radia Doychev
 Plamen Timnev
 Ivan Stoyanov

Note: For a complete list of Sliven players, see :Category:OFC Sliven 2000 players.

Stadium

The stadium Hadzhi Dimitar in Sliven (15,000 seats) was built in the 1950s. First big reconstructions were run in the period 1984 - 1989. Currently Hadzhi Dimitar is part of a big multifunctional sports compound, still under development - at completion featuring hotel, restaurant, 2 training grass pitches, tennis courts, swimming pool. The athletic track of Hadzhi Dimitar is meeting all requirements of IAAF for hosting international competitions. The stadium complex has the only training pitch with FieldTurf flooring in Bulgaria. The size of the official pitch is 105m x 68m. Record attendance of the stadium is 30,000 people.

External links
 Official Site
 Hadzhi Dimitar Stadium
 Fansite

Association football clubs established in 1964
Association football clubs established in 2000
Sliven
Sliven
2000 establishments in Bulgaria
Military association football clubs in Bulgaria

References